Daniel Maltzman (born March 9, 1963) is an American artist known for his Pop-Surrealist paintings. His work is contemporary and inspired by great artists in history, including Richter and Warhol. Maltzman focuses on drippy, layered abstracts, strong female forms, and a series of shadow figures. He lives and works in Los Angeles, California.

Maltzman's works are showcased in four galleries throughout the world, including a gallery in his namesake he opened in August 2012. The gallery is located in Beverly Hills and is a constant rotation of his work, occasionally juxtaposed with the works of newer local artist Maltzman finds. His most common medium is 6 feet by 5 feet, acrylic on canvas, priced beginning at $16,000.00.

Maltzman is known for his frequent involvement with local charities. He and his art have been featured on numerous television shows filmed in the Los Angeles Area.

Works 

Although each Daniel Maltzman painting is one of a kind, the artist has found subjects and motifs that over time have transformed into symbols that represent his artistic identity.

Shadow Figures 

As an early painter, inspired by Giacometti, Maltzman began his Shadow Figure series with Father and Daughter (1992). Ranging from singular figures to shadow groups, he captured an illusive form, highlighting light and dark. The series moved forward to colored shadow figures and panels. More than a decade later, Maltzman's Shadow Figures expanded to include Runway Shadow Figures (2003) which merged the original figures and those of fashion illustration. The Shadow Gallery also came about at this time, while Maltzman discovered an interest in perspective.

Babe 

Maltzman's interest in the female form began early in his career with The Babe (1993). This bikini clad woman encompasses Maltzman's upbringing in Southern California. The woman is carefree and sun-kissed. Although each painting is unique and original, Maltzman continues to recreate this image, redefining his understanding of what is sexy.

Marilyn 

In typical Hollywood fashion, Maltzman found Marilyn Monroe as a muse early on his career. The Marilyn series continue to grow to this day and is perhaps his most successful series. Portraits of Marilyn's face overlay Maltzman's signature abstract. What Maltzman has taken from Warhol's genius is evident in this series.

Abstracts 

Inspired by Richter, Maltzman layers and pulls paints creating his bright and colorful abstracts. The drips Maltzman leaves behind have become an identifying feature to the artist's entire collection, especially his abstracts. These paintings can take anywhere from a month to three years to finish, as Maltzman often re-enters his abstract work. Most of these abstracts involve textured colors seeping through a more neutral top layer. Other types of abstracts include Maltzman's cubic abstract series. These panels, occasionally on wood rather than canvas, work singularly as thin pieces or come together as massive triptychs.

Women 

Maltzman's largest series is his Women. The paintings consist of a female form overlaying a Maltzman abstract. These form range from celebrities, such as Kate Moss, to the every woman and more elusive females. Maltzman's love of women is clear as this series stretches from sexy to sophisticated.

Exhibitions

Solo exhibitions 

2012-PRESENT Permanent installation of new works. GALLERY-BEVERLY HILLS, CA 2008 “For A Cure”, LURIE GALLERY, Beverly Hills, CA

2004 “Women” THE FIGURATIVE GALLERY, La Quinta, CA

2003 MAGIDSON FINE ART GALLERY, Aspen, CO

2002 DON O’MELVENY GALLERY, Los Angeles, CA 2001 DENISE ROBERGE, Palm Desert, CA

2000 DESERT ART SOURCE, Rancho Mirage, CA

Group exhibitions 

2012–Present CODA Gallery, Palm Desert, CA

2010 MELISA MORGAN FINE ART, Palm Desert, CA 2009–Present AMSTEL GALLERY, Amsterdam, The Netherlands 2009–Present RUSSEL COLLECTION, Austin, TX

2009–Present WEBER FINE ART, Greenwich, CT & Scarsdale, New York 2007–08 “Warhol and...” KANTOR FEUER GALLERY, Los Angeles, CA

2007–08 “Going to the Dogs” CATHERINE KELLEGHAN GALLERY Atlanta, GA

2005–08 “Pop” MODERN MASTERS FINE ART GALLERY, Palm Desert, CA

2004–08 “Shadows” SELBY FLEETWOOD GALLERY, Santa Fe, NM

2002 “Movement” BGH GALLERY, Bergamot Station, Santa Monica, CA

Museum exhibitions 

2009–13 “Incognito” SANTA MONICA MUSEUM of ART, CA

2006 “Artists Emerging” LACMA, Los Angeles, CA

2006 HUNTSVILLE MUSEUM OF ART, Huntsville, AL

Honors 

2014 Official Artist of the Pebble Beach ProAm Golf Tournament

Filmography

As himself

Art appearances 

The artwork of Daniel Maltzman has been featured on television shows such as: Don't Trust the B- in Apartment 23, Dirty Sexy Money, Dog Whisperer, MTV's Paris Hilton's New BFF, and Nip/Tuck.

References 

1963 births
Living people
American artists